Iyo ang Tondo, Kanya ang Cavite is a 1986 Filipino action film directed by Pablo Santiago and written by Agustin B. de la Cruz, starring Fernando Poe Jr. and Ramon Revilla.

The film earned less at the box office than what its producers anticipated, with industry observers assuming that GMA Network's television broadcasts of past Poe films had likely drawn audiences away from watching Poe's new films in cinemas.

Plot
Crisanto (Fernando Poe Jr.) is a valiant man from the streets of Tondo beloved by its people for his acts of vigilantism and his Robin Hood-like generosity to its poor. Bador (Ramon Revilla), on the other hand, is an influential man in Cavite's underworld whose tight grip is recognized in the entire province. Crisanto and Bador are good friends dating back to their incarceration at the New Bilibid Prison.

Their friendship will be put to the ultimate test as the Kingpin of Tondo is pitted against his staunch ally, the Don of the Cavite gangland, by a cabal of men from both Tondo and Cavite eager to oust both from their respective thrones. Now the best of friends become the worst of enemies as Tondo collides with Cavite.

Cast
Fernando Poe Jr. as Crisanto
Ramon Revilla as Bador
Anita Linda as Desta
Liza Lorena as Luz
Paquito Diaz as Kiko
Berting Labra as Berto
Ruel Vernal as David
Lito Anzures as Andres
Jaime Fabregas as Felix
Max Alvarado as Ponzo
Romy Diaz as Romy
Larry Silva as Celso
Susan Katigbak as Celia
Tony Carreon as Señor Monterrazo
Edwin O'Hara as Mr. Hernandez
Victor Bravo
Lito Garcia
Christopher Paloma as Cris
Butch Bautista as Botong
Vic Diaz as Kanor
Nello Nayo as Kardo
Tony Gonzales as Atty. Angeles
Renato del Prado as Gildo
King Gutierrez as Golem
Carmen Enriquez as Carmen
Willie Chavez
Carlos de Leon as Donato
Rosanna Jover
Ernie David as Siano
Angelo Ventura as Cabo
Jess Vargas
Michelle Cancio
Ben Tisoy

Release
The BSH Films-produced film was released on January 30, 1986

Box office
The film earned less at the box office than what its producers expected. Observers of the film business suggested that it is likely due to GMA Network having started to broadcast Poe's past films through the television program FPJ sa GMA, which may have drawn audiences away from watching Poe's new films in cinemas. Another reason given was Poe's politics: Poe supported the reelection of President Ferdinand Marcos in the 1986 snap elections, which may have affected his popularity among his viewers.

Restored version
The film was restored in high definition by FPJ Productions. The restored version was premiered on ABS-CBN on June 9, 2019.

Aborted remake
Off the heels of the success  Manila Kingpin: The Asiong Salonga Story, its lead star ER Ejercito expressed a desire to do a remake of Iyo ang Tondo, Kanya ang Cavite. The film would have starred Ejercito as Crisanto and his El Presidente co-star Cesar Montano as Bador. The said remake would have been shot after El Presidente wrapped up. However, the remake never came to fruition as Ejercito instead moved on to other projects, Boy Golden: Shoot to Kill, and Muslim Magnum .357: To Serve and Protect, respectively. The latter film was a remake of the 1986 film starring Fernando Poe Jr.

References

External links

1986 films
Films set in Manila
Philippine action films
Films directed by Pablo Santiago